The Roman Catholic Archdiocese of Olinda and Recife is a Latin metropolitan archdiocese in northeast Brazil's Pernambuco state.

Special churches 
 Its cathedral archiepiscopal see is a World Heritage Site (Minor): Catedral Metropolitana São Salvador do Mundo, in Olinda
 Its Co-Cathedral is São Pedro dos Clérigos, dedicated to Saint Peter of Clerics, in Recife
 Further it has Minor Basilicas :
 Basílica Abacial do Mosteiro de São Bento de Olinda, in Olinda
 Basílica de Nossa Senhora do Carmo, in Recife
 Basílica Nossa Senhora de Penha, Pernambuco
 Basílica Sagrado Coração de Jesus, Recife
 Basílica Santuário de Nossa Senhora Auxiliadora, in Jaboatão dos Guararapes
 Historic churches
Capela Dourada, Recife
Igreja de Nossa Senhora da Conceição dos Militares, Recife
Igreja dos Santos Cosme e Damião, Igarassu
Igreja e Convento de Santo Antônio, Igarassu

History 
 Established on 17 July 1614 as Territorial Prelature of Pernambuco, on territory split off from the then Diocese of São Salvador da Bahia de Todos os Santos
 Promoted on 11 November 1676 and renamed after its see as Diocese of Olinda

 Lost territories repeatedly: on 1677.08.30 to establish Diocese of São Luís do Maranhão, on 1854.06.06 to establish Diocese of Ceará, on 1892.04.27 to establish Diocese of Paraiba and on 1900.07.02 to establish Diocese of Alagôas
 Promoted on 5 December 1910 as Metropolitan Archdiocese of Olinda, having lost territory to establish the Diocese of Floresta, its suffragan
 Renamed on 26 July 1918 as Metropolitan Archdiocese of Olinda e Recife, reflecting its double see
 Lost territories repeatedly again : on 1918.08.02 to establish Diocese of Garanhuns and Diocese of Nazaré, on 1948.08.07 to establish Diocese of Caruaru, and on 1962.01.13 to establish Diocese of Palmares.

Ecclesiastical province 
Its Suffragan sees are :
 Roman Catholic Diocese of Afogados da Ingazeira 
 Roman Catholic Diocese of Caruaru
 Roman Catholic Diocese of Floresta, a daughter
 Roman Catholic Diocese of Garanhuns, a daughter
 Roman Catholic Diocese of Nazaré, a daughter
 Roman Catholic Diocese of Palmares, its junior daughter
 Roman Catholic Diocese of Pesqueira
 Roman Catholic Diocese of Petrolina
 Roman Catholic Diocese of Salgueiro

Statistics 

As per 2014, it pastorally served 3,804,000 Catholics (94.5% of 4,024,000 total) on 4,058 km² in 114 parishes and 689 missions with 277 priests (122 diocesan, 155 religious), 32 deacons, 1,143 lay religious (251 brothers, 892 sisters) with 63 seminarians.

Bishops
(all Roman Rite)

Episcopal ordinaries
Suffragan Bishops of Olinda
 Estevão Brioso de Figueiredo (born Portugal) (16 Nov 1676 - 27 Sep 1683), next Bishop of Funchal (Madeira, Portugal (27 Sep 1683 – death 1689.05.20) 
 João Duarte do Sacramento not possessed (1685 - death 1685) 
 Matias de Figueiredo e Mello (12 May 1687 - death 18 July 1694 ) 
 Francisco de Lima (Lemos) (born Portugal) (22 August 1695 - death 29 April 1704), previously Bishop of São Luís do Maranhão (Brazil) (1691.12.19 – 22 August 1695) 
 Manuel Alvares da Costa (born Portugal) (7 June 1706 - 20 Jan 1721), next Bishop of Angra (Portugal) (1721.01.20 – death 1733.01.10)
 José de Fialho (born Portugal) (21 Feb 1725 - 3 Sep 1738), next Metropolitan Archbishop of (São Salvador da) Bahia (Brazil) (1738.09.03 – 1741.01.02), Archbishop-Bishop of Guarda (Portugal) (1741.01.02 – 1741.03.18) 
 Luiz de Santa Teresa da Cruz Salgado de Castilho (born Portugal) (3 Sep 1738 - death 17 Nov 1757) 
 Francisco Xavier Aranha (17 Nov 1757 - death 5 Oct 1771), previously Titular Bishop of Thermopylæ (1754.02.11 – 1757.11.17) as Coadjutor Bishop of Olinda (1754.02.11 – 1757.11.17)
 Francisco da Assumpção e Brito (born Portugal) (8 March 1773 - 20 Dec 1773), next Metropolitan Archbishop of Goa (then Portuguese India) (1773.12.20 – retired 1783.06.23), died 1808
 Tomaz da Encarnação da Costa e Lima (18 April 1774 - died 14 Jan 1784) 
 Diego de Jesus Jardim (14 Feb 1785 - 21 Feb 1794), next Bishop of Elvas (Portugal) (1794.02.21 – death 1796.05.30) 
 José Joaquim da Cunha Azeredo Coutinho (12 Sep 1794 - 6 Oct 1806), next Bishop of Elvas (Portugal) (1806.10.06 – death 1821.09.12)
 José Maria de Araújo (born Portugal) (6 Oct 1806 - death 21 Sep 1809) 
 Antônio de São José Bastos (15 March 1815 - death 19 July 1819) 
 ? Tomaz de Noronha e Brito (1828 – 1829) (23 June 1828 - death 6 March 1829) 
 ? Tomas Manoel de Noronha e Britto (born Portugal) (23 June 1828 - death 6 March 1829)
 João da Purificação Marques Perdigão (28 Feb 1831 - retired 30 April 1864), previously Bishop of Cochin (India) (1819.12.17 – 1828.06.23); died 1874 
BIOS to ELABORATE
 Francisco Cardoso Aires (20 Dec 1867 - 12 May 1870) 
 Vital Maria Gonçalves de Oliveira (21 May 1871 - 4 July 1878) 
 José Pereira da Silva Barros (7 Jan 1881 - 25 June 1891), appointed Bishop of São Sebastião do Rio de Janeiro 
 João Fernando Santiago Esberard (Esberrard) (born Spain) (12 May 1891 - 12 Sep 1893), appointed Archbishop of São Sebastião do Rio de Janeiro
 Manoel dos Santos Pereira (12 Sep 1893 - 25 April 1900 ) 
 Luís Raimundo da Silva Brito (23 Feb 1901 - 5 Dec 1910 see below)Metropolitan Archbishops of Olinda 
 Luís Raimundo da Silva Brito (see above 5 Dec 1910- 9 Dec 1915) 
 Sebastião (Leme) da Silveira Cintra (29 April 1916 - 29 April 1918 see below)Metropolitan Archbishops of Olinda & Recife
 Sebastião (Leme) da Silveira Cintra (see above 29 April 1918 - 15 March 1921), appointed Coadjutor Archbishop of São Sebastião do Rio de Janeiro; future Cardinal
 Miguel de Lima Valverde † (10 Feb 1922 - 7 May 1951) 
 Antônio de Almeida Moraes Junior † (17 Nov 1951 - 23 April 1960), appointed Archbishop of Niterói, Rio de Janeiro
  † (23 April 1960 - 7 March 1964 ) 
 Helder Pessoa Câmara † (12 March 1964 - 2 April 1985), world-famous liberation theology icon 
 José Cardoso Sobrinho (2 April 1985 - 16 August 2009)
  (16 August 2009 - ...).

Coadjutor bishops
 Coadjutor Bishop: Francisco Xavier Aranha (1754.02.11 – 1757.11.17)
 Coadjutor Bishop: João Fernando Santiago Esberard (Esberrard) (1890.06.26 – 1891.05.12); future Archbishop
 Coadjutor Archbishop: João Irineu Joffily (1914.08.18 – 1916.05.04), did not succeed to see; appointed Bishop of Amazonas
 Coadjutor Archbishop: João Batista Portocarrero Costa (1953.07.03 – 1959.01.06), did not succeed to see

Auxiliary bishops 
 Auxiliary Bishop: José Lamartine Soares (1962.11.16 – 1985.04.02), appointed Archbishop of Maceió, Alagoas
 Auxiliary Bishop: Hilário Moser (1988.08.17 – 1992.05.27), appointed Bishop of Tubarão, Santa Catarina
 Auxiliary Bishop: João Evangelista Martins Terra, S.J. (1988.08.17 – 1994.06.15), appointed Auxiliary Bishop of Brasília, Distrito Federal
 Auxiliary Bishop: Bishop Fernando Antônio Saburido, O.S.B. (2000.05.31 – 2005.05.18), appointed Bishop of Sobral, Ceara (later returned here as Archbishop)

Other priests of this diocese who became bishops
Jerónimo Thomé da Silva, appointed Bishop of Belém do Pará in 1890
Francisco do Rêgo Maia, appointed Bishop of Niterói (Nictheroy) in 1893 
Augusto Álvaro da Silva, appointed Bishop of Floresta in 1912; future Cardinal
Ricardo Ramos de Castro Vilela, appointed Bishop of Nazaré, Pernambuco in 1919
João Tavares de Moura, appointed Bishop of Garanhuns, Pernambuco in 1919
José Pereira Alves, appointed Bishop of Natal in 1922

See also 
 List of Catholic dioceses in Brazil

Sources and external links 

 GCatholic.org, with Google map and satellite photo - data for all sections
 Catholic Hierarchy
 Archdiocese website (Portuguese)

Roman Catholic dioceses in Brazil
Roman Catholic ecclesiastical provinces in Brazil
 
Religious organizations established in the 1610s
Roman Catholic dioceses and prelatures established in the 17th century